The Thrangu Tashi Yangtse Monastery is a Tibetan Buddhist monastery about 40 km (by road) southeast of Nepal's capital city Kathmandu and 2.3km from Manegaun, a Tamang village. It lies at the top of the hill in Namobuddha Municipality. It is one of the most beautiful and a center for tourism. The main festivals and mela celebrated here are Kartik Purnima and Buddha Jayanti.  
According to the old legend, 6000 years ago, prince (Mahasatwo/Ngingdui Tshenpo), at the top of the hill, looking the jungle, discovers a tigress lying near the rock. Very quickly, he realizes that the tigress was about to die due to hunger with her five little babies still sucking milk from her, survivals of the babies depend on their mother. Mahasatwo, decides to give his life to the tigress in a bust of love and compassion. So Prince Mahasatwo cuts his body to present his warm blood in the mouth of the mother tiger,  and the taste of blood gives the appetite to the starving family. As the tigress accepts the sacrifice from prince she leaves only the bones. The bones of prince were brought back in the village and buried in the tomb which is actual stupa of Namo Buddha.
Some about 3500 years later,  the Gautam Buddha came in the village of Sange da Fyafulsa, He conducts 3 tour around the Stupa before he declared that he was the reincarnation of prince Mahasatwo.

  Since it was founded by V.V. Khenchen Thrangu Rinpoche in 1978 the monastery has grown such that today it is home to more than 250 monks.

The Thrangu Tashi Yangtse Temple (photo at left) was officially opened on December 5, 2008.  The Shree Mangal Dvip Branch School for young monks is also part of the monastery complex.

References

External links
Monastery website

Tibetan Buddhist monasteries
Buddhist monasteries in Nepal
Tibetan Buddhism in Nepal
1978 establishments in Nepal
Buildings and structures in Kavrepalanchok District